Lucile Cypriano (born 2 September 1996) is a French racing driver currently competing in the SEAT León Eurocup. She previously competed in the TCR International Series, Volkswagen Scirocco R-Cup and French F4 Championship.

Racing career
Cypriano began her career in 2003 in karting. After karting for 10 years she switched to the French F4 Championship in 2013, she ended 21st in the championship standings that year. In 2014 Cypriano switched to the Volkswagen Scirocco R-Cup, she ended the season 12th in standings. In 2015 Cypriano made her SEAT León Eurocup debut with JSB Compétition, she took her first pole position in the second round at Estoril. In April 2015, it was announced that Cypriano would make her TCR International Series debut with JSB Compétition driving a SEAT León Cup Racer. She also became the first female racer in the series.

Racing record

Complete TCR International Series results
(key) (Races in bold indicate pole position) (Races in italics indicate fastest lap)

References

External links
 
 

1996 births
Living people
French female racing drivers
French racing drivers
French F4 Championship drivers
SEAT León Eurocup drivers
TCR International Series drivers
Sportspeople from Hauts-de-Seine
Auto Sport Academy drivers